A gubernatorial election in Kaliningrad Oblast was held on 10 September 2017.

Background
28 July 2016 the Governor Nikolay Tsukanov resigned. The acting Governor was Yevgeny Zinichev. 6 October 2016 Yevgeny Zinichev resigned from the post of the acting Governor, in connection with family circumstances, the new acting Governor was appointed Anton Alikhanov.

Key dates
8 Jun 2017 — Kaliningrad Oblast Duma has appointed elections to 10 September 2017.
from 11 to 21 July — submission of documents for registration of candidates.
from 12 August to 8 September — the period of campaigning in the mass media.
9 September 2017 — day of Election silence.
10 September 2017 — election day.
24 September 2017 — possible second round of election.

Candidates
Candidates on the ballot:

Opinion polls

Result

See also
2017 Russian gubernatorial elections

References

2017 elections in Russia
2017 Russian gubernatorial elections
Politics of Kaliningrad Oblast